Kakutarō, Kakutaro, Kakutarou or Kakutaroh (written:  or ) is a masculine Japanese given name. Notable people with the name include:

, Japanese sumo wrestler
, Japanese businessman

Japanese masculine given names